A disciplinary repository (or subject repository) is an online archive containing works or data associated with these works of scholars in a particular subject area. Disciplinary repositories can accept work from scholars from any institution. A disciplinary repository shares the roles of collecting, disseminating, and archiving work with other repositories, but is focused on a particular subject area. These collections can include academic and research papers.

Disciplinary repositories can acquire their content in many ways. Many rely on author or organization submissions, such as SSRN. Others such as CiteSeerX crawl the web for scholar and researcher websites and download publicly available academic papers from those sites. AgEcon, established in 1995, grew as a result of active involvement of academia and societies.

A disciplinary repository generally covers one broad based discipline, with contributors from many different institutions supported by a variety of funders; the repositories themselves are likely to be funded from one or more sources within the subject community. Deposit of material in a disciplinary repository is sometimes mandated by research funders.

Disciplinary repositories can also act as stores of data related to a particular subject, allowing documents along with data associated with that work to be stored in the repository.

What was believed to be the first public Workshop on Disciplinary Repositories was held on June 16 and 17, 2011, at the ACM Joint Conference on Digital Libraries in Ottawa, Ontario, Canada.

Examples 

 Open Access Directory, "Disciplinary repositories"

References 

Discipline-oriented digital libraries
Archival science
Open access (publishing)